Cui Kai (born on March 26, 1982) is a retired Chinese track and field athlete who specialised in the high jump. He won silver medal at the inaugural World Youth Championships in 1999.

He has personal bests of 2.25 metres outdoors (2003) and 2.15 metres indoors (2004).

Competition record

References

1982 births
Living people
Chinese male high jumpers
Athletes (track and field) at the 2002 Asian Games
Universiade medalists in athletics (track and field)
Asian Games medalists in athletics (track and field)
Asian Games silver medalists for China
Medalists at the 2002 Asian Games
Universiade bronze medalists for China
Medalists at the 2003 Summer Universiade
20th-century Chinese people
21st-century Chinese people